Big Hawk Lake is a lake in the Trent River and Lake Ontario drainage basins in Algonquin Highlands, Haliburton County, Ontario, Canada.

The primary inflow is the Kennisis River arriving from Nunikani Lake over Nunikani Dam at the north, and a channel from Little Hawk Lake at the south. Secondary inflows are Blackcat Creek at the northwest and unnamed creeks from Sherborne Lake and Big Brothe Lake at the west. The primary outflow, at the southwest and controlled by the Big Hawk Lake Dam, is the Kennisis River to Halls Lake.

Types Of fish include

 Rock Bass
 Small Mouth Bass
 Large Mouth Bass
 Yellow Perch
 Lake Whitefish
 Brook Trout
 Ninespine stickleback
 Rainbow smelt
 Burbot
 Lake trout 
 White Sucker
 Splake
 Brown Bullhead catfish
 Channel Catfish
 White Perch

See also
List of lakes in Ontario

References

Lakes of Haliburton County